David C. Bustion (born August 30, 1949), also known as Stretch is a retired American basketball player.

He played collegiately for the University of Denver.

He was selected by the Kansas City–Omaha Kings in the 5th round (68th pick overall) of the 1972 NBA draft.

He played for the Denver Rockets (1972–73) in the ABA.

After Bustion's stint in the ABA, he played professionally in France for Denain, Paris Bagnolet, Paris Bagnolet-Stade Français (Champion de France) where he served as player-coach for a time.
He also played in Switzerland for Champel Geneva, ESL Vernier and finally Geneva Pâquis-Seujet.

References

External links
Geneva Pâquis-Seujet Basketball Club

1949 births
Living people
American expatriate basketball people in France
American men's basketball players
Basketball coaches from Alabama
Basketball players from Alabama
Denver Pioneers men's basketball players
Denver Rockets players
Junior college men's basketball players in the United States
Kansas City Kings draft picks
Player-coaches
Power forwards (basketball)
Sportspeople from Gadsden, Alabama